Neohelvibotys oxalis is a moth in the family Crambidae. It is found on the Juan Fernandez Islands.

References

Moths described in 1965
Pyraustinae